Edward Newton Ament (1860–1949) was Mayor of Berkeley, California, United States from 1932 to 1939.

Ament was born in Arcata, California July 30, 1860.   He 1889, he married Florence Moody.  They had one daughter.

Ament was the proprietor of the Ashby Furniture Company in Berkeley.

Before being becoming Mayor, he served as president of the library board which oversaw the construction of the Berkeley Public Library.  He was appointed to the Berkeley City Council in May 1932 upon the resignation of Agnes Moody, and became Mayor in December of the same year.

He died of heart failure on February 25, 1949, in Berkeley while sitting in his dentist's waiting room.  He was interred at the Sunset View Cemetery in nearby El Cerrito.

References
 Berkeley Gazette, February 26, 1949
 Berkeley Voice, May 11, 2007
Contra Costa Times 2008
Political Graveyard

1860 births
1949 deaths
People from Arcata, California
American Congregationalists
Mayors of Berkeley, California